Talk It Over in the Morning is the fifth studio album by Canadian singer Anne Murray, issued in 1971 on Capitol Records. The album peaked at number 26 on the Billboard Country Albums chart. It was reissued in the UK in 1981 by the Music for Pleasure (MFP) label with different album art but the same track listing. As singles, "Talk it Over in the Morning" and "Cotton Jenny" were both #1 hits in the Canadian country charts. "Let Me Be the One" was released as the second single (Capitol CL15711) from the album in the UK with "Destiny" on the flip. Later in 1972 the single was reissued (CL15734) with "Destiny" as the A side, peaking at No.41 on the chart.

Track listing

Timings from the MFP album.

Awards
Talk it Over in the Morning won the 1972 Juno Award for Best Produced MOR Album.

References

1971 albums
Anne Murray albums
Albums produced by Brian Ahern (producer)
Capitol Records albums